This is a list of festivals and fairs in the San Francisco Bay Area, both ongoing and defunct.

By type

Film
 American Indian Film Festival
 Arab Film Festival
 Berlin & Beyond Film Festival
 Cinequest Film Festival
 Disposable Film Festival
 Frameline Film Festival
 Hi/Lo Film Festival
 International Black Women's Film Festival
 Mill Valley Film Festival
 Palo Alto International Film Festival
 San Francisco Frozen Film Festival
 San Francisco Green Film Festival
 San Francisco International Asian American Film Festival
 San Francisco International Film Festival
 San Francisco International Lesbian and Gay Film Festival
 San Francisco Jewish Film Festival
 San Francisco Ocean Film Festival
 San Francisco Silent Film Festival
 Sonoma International Film Festival (AKA Sonoma Valley Film Festival)
 Superfest International Disability Film Festival
 Temescal Street Cinema
 Third World Independent Film Festival

Cultural and folk
Asian Heritage Street Celebration

Theater and arts
 Bay Area Circus Arts Festival

Music

 Bay Area Indie Music Festival - Martinez, California
 Bay Area Rock Fest
 Bear Valley Music Festival
 Cotati Jazz Festival - Cotati, California
 Day on the Green
 Hardly Strictly Bluegrass
 Harmony Sweepstakes A Cappella Festival
 Fantasy Fair and Magic Mountain Music Festival
 Loveparade
Music at Tateuchi
 Treasure Island Music Festival
 Vans Warped Tour

General and other

 Bay Area Maker Faire
 Bay to Breakers
 Berkeley Jazz Festival
 BottleRock Napa Valley
 Burning Man
 Caltopia
 Carnaval San Francisco
 Castro Street Fair
 Eat Real Festival
 Exotic Erotic Ball
 Festival del Sole
 Fiesta on the Hill - Bernal Heights, San Francisco
 Fillmore Jazz Festival
 Ghirardelli Chocolate Festival - September 
 Gilroy Community Festival - Gilroy, California
 Gilroy Garlic Festival - Gilroy, California
 Green Festival
 Haight-Ashbury Street Fair
 Halloween in the Castro
 How Weird Street Faire
 KFOG KaBoom
 Lafayette Art & Wine Festival
 Litquake
 Maker Faire
 Midsummer Mozart Festival
 Mission Creek Music and Arts Festival
 Napa Valley Festival del Sole
 Noise Pop Festival
 Northern California Folk-Rock Festival (1968)
 Northern California Folk-Rock Festival (1969)
 Opera in the Park hosted by San Francisco Opera
 Other Minds Music Festival
 Outside Lands Music and Arts Festival
 Oyster Festival
 PeaceOUT World Homo Hop Festival - Oakland, California
 Pink Saturday
 The Renegade Craft Fair in San Francisco
 Russell City Blues Festival
 San Francisco Blues Festival
 San Francisco Chinese New Year Festival and Parade
 San Francisco Jazz Festival
 San Francisco LovEvolution
 San Francisco Juneteenth Festival
 San Francisco Marathon
 San Francisco Pop Festival
 San Francisco Pride
 San Jose Holiday Parade
 San Jose Jazz Festival
 SF Sketchfest - San Francisco comedy sketch festival
 Sierra Nevada World Music Festival
 Slow Food Nation
 Solano Avenue Stroll
 Soundwave Festival
 Stanford Jazz Workshop
 Stern Grove Festival in San Francisco
 Wonderfest - San Francisco Bay Area festival of science

LGBT
 Folsom Street Fair
 Gay Pride Parade and Festival
 San Francisco International Lesbian and Gay Film Festival

References

External links

San
Festivals
San